Gledhow is a suburb of north east Leeds, West Yorkshire, England, east of Chapel Allerton and west of Roundhay.

It sits in the Roundhay ward of Leeds City Council and Leeds North East parliamentary constituency.

Etymology
The name Gledhow is first attested the period 1334-37 as Gledhou. Its etymology is uncertain. The gled- element could plausibly come from the Old English words gleoda ('kite, bird of prey') or glēd ('embers, burning coals'). The second element could be from Old English hōh ('ridge, escarpment') or Old Norse haugr ('hill'). It has been suggested (in relation to similar names like Gledhill) that a gled- element may alternatively be based on the Old Norse ‘å glede’ (to please, or be glad about a subject) giving a translation of 'Pleasant Hill.'

Description and history

Well into the  19th century, Gledhow was known as a picturesque area of woodland near Leeds. It had become a suburb of Leeds by the late 19th century. Gledhow Valley is a strip of mixed deciduous woodland on either side of a beck and lake. Gipton Spa, a bathhouse dating from 1671, is in the woods.  Passing through the valley is Gledhow Valley Road, built in 1926.

Gledhow Lane crosses Gledhow Valley Road and on the eastern side is a steep road up from the valley. A residential area near the top has been referred to as "Little Switzerland", although a Leeds City Council website refers to this as a "former" name.

Gledhow Primary School is on Lidgett Lane. Roundhay School and Kerr Mackie primary school are adjacent to each other off Gledhow Lane. To the north are Allerton Grange School and Moor Allerton Hall Primary School.

Gledhow is served by bus services 3/13 on Brackenwood Drive and 3A/13A on Lidgett Lane. The hourly service 38 is alternately operated by First Leeds and Yorkshire Tiger.

Gledhow Hall is a 17th-century mansion and Grade II* listed building, once the home of James Kitson, 1st Baron Airedale. It is now private flats.

Notable people
Arthur Louis Aaron, Leeds' only Second World War recipient of the Victoria Cross, was born in Gledhow.
Sir Edmund Beckett, 4th Baronet (1787 – 1874), railway promoter and politician, was born at Gledhow Hall.
Albert Johanneson professional footballer (Leeds United) lived in Gledhow Towers.

Gallery

See also
Listed buildings in Leeds (Roundhay Ward)

References

External links

Friends of Gledhow Valley Woods

Places in Leeds